Caster Concepts is a privately held manufacturing corporation located in Albion, Michigan which builds heavy duty industrial casters casters, wheels, and accessories for manual and powered applications, including a line of motorized industrial casters.

Industries serviced include automotive, aerospace, aviation, ground support, and many others.

Product lines 
Caster Concepts manufacture a complete line of ergonomic products designed to reduce workplace injury due to overexertion., as well as maintenance-free casters, and casters designed to help increase battery life on AGVs. In addition, the company manufactures its own polyurethane wheel material in various durometers and formulations. 
Caster Concepts specializes in the Heavy Duty Caster category. Their Heavy Duty Caster weight capacities include: 
Heavy Duty: 2,000-4,999lbs.
Extra Heavy Duty: 5,000-16,999lbs.
Super Heavy Duty: 17,000-50,000lbs.  

Caster Concepts is an ISO9001-certified company, with approximately 60% of the company’s products custom or made to order.  Caster Concepts manufactures wheels to withstand impact, corrosion, temperature extremes and chemicals in harsh industrial environments. Their products are primarily sold throughout U.S, Canada, and Mexico to customers in the automotive and aerospace industries.

Brands 

 Drive Caster ®
 CasterShoX®
 TWERGO®
 ERGOEXCEL TM
 Swivel on Swivel (SOS)
 Hercules

Subsidiaries 

 Modern Suspension- Specialized producer of Spring Loaded Casters
 Larcaster- Torsion Casters
 Reaction Industries-polyurethane molding
 Conveyor Concepts-conveyor products and replacement parts
 Conceptual Innovations- Custom Engineering, prototyping, limited production runs
 Fabricating Concepts- Custom metal fabrication
 The Machine Center- Machining
 Albion Machine and Tool- Machining
 Triple E- Machining
 Aerol Caster Company - Trusted Manufacturer of Industrial Aluminum Casters and Military Running Gear in the Aerospace and Defense industries since 1946. 
 Mitchell Golf- A producer of golf club customization tools and repair equipment

References

External link

Privately held companies based in Michigan
Manufacturing companies based in Michigan
Albion, Michigan
American companies established in 1987
1987 establishments in Michigan